Corvette Z06 may refer to:

Chevrolet Corvette (C2) Z06, based on the C2 platform in 1963
Chevrolet Corvette (C5) Z06, based on the C5 platform 2001–2004
Chevrolet Corvette (C6) Z06, based on the C6 platform 2006–2013
Chevrolet Corvette (C7) Z06, based on the C7 platform 2015–2019
Chevrolet Corvette (C8) Z06, based on the C8 platform 2020